Yacarerani (meaning "first Yacare" in Guaraní) is an extinct genus of Late Cretaceous notosuchian crocodylomorph. Fossils have been found in 2002 in the Cajones Formation in Amboró National Park of central Bolivia and are Turonian-Santonian in age. The genus was described in 2009 in the Journal of Vertebrate Paleontology. The material represents two individuals and was found in association with eggs that are thought to have been part of a nest. It may have lived in small groups, creating burrows to lay eggs in.

Description and taxonomy 
The dentition of Yacarerani, like many other notosuchians, is heterodont, with different tooth morphologies in different parts of the jaws. Two teeth in the lower jaw project forward from the tip, resembling the incisors of a rabbit. Other teeth, situated posteriorly, are cusped and adapted for grinding or chopping food such as tubers or small arthropods. In the lower jaw, the dentary tooth rows merge posterior to the anterior dentary teeth. The same is true for the upper tooth rows, which merge on the palate.

Yacarerani presents similar teeth morphology  to Adamantinasuchus navae, a crocodylomorph from Adamantina Formation, Bauru Group, Brazil.

Below is a cladogram from Novas et al. (2009) showing the phylogenetic position of Yacarerani:

References 

Sphagesaurids
Terrestrial crocodylomorphs
Turonian life
Santonian life
Late Cretaceous crocodylomorphs of South America
Cretaceous Bolivia
Fossils of Bolivia
Fossil taxa described in 2009
Prehistoric pseudosuchian genera